Winters Airport may refer to:
Yolo County Airport near Winters, California
Winters Municipal Airport in Winters, Texas